The 1977 St. Louis Cardinals season was the team's 96th season in St. Louis, Missouri and its 86th season in the National League. The Cardinals went 83–79 during the season and finished third in the National League East, 18 games behind the Philadelphia Phillies.

Vern Rapp took over as the Cardinals' manager this year, after the twelve-year reign of their longtime manager Red Schoendienst. On August 29, Cardinals left-fielder Lou Brock broke the modern-day stolen base record, by stealing bases 892 and 893 in a game against the Padres in San Diego.

Offseason 
 October 20, 1976: Willie Crawford, John Curtis and Vic Harris were traded by the Cardinals to the San Francisco Giants for Mike Caldwell, Dave Rader and John D'Acquisto.
 November 6, 1976: Bill Greif, Ángel Torres and Sam Mejías were traded by the Cardinals to the Montreal Expos for Pat Scanlon, Steve Dunning, and Tony Scott.
 November 6, 1976: Lee Richard was released by the Cardinals.
 November 21, 1977: Luis DeLeón was signed as an amateur free agent by the Cardinals.
 December 6, 1976: Roger Freed was selected by the Cardinals from the Montreal Expos in the rule 5 draft.
 January 11, 1977: Jesse Orosco was drafted by the Cardinals in the 7th round of the 1977 Major League Baseball Draft, but did not sign.  He would later pitch for the club in 2000.
 February 28, 1977: Mark Covert (minors) was traded by the Cardinals to the Chicago Cubs for Buddy Schultz.
 March 24, 1977: Tom Walker was released by the Cardinals.
 March 28, 1977: Bill Caudill was traded by the Cardinals to the Cincinnati Reds for Joel Youngblood.
 March 30, 1977: Doug Clarey was traded by the Cardinals to the New York Mets for Benny Ayala.
 March 31, 1977: Ken Rudolph was purchased from the Cardinals by the San Francisco Giants.

Regular season

Opening Day starters 
Lou Brock
Héctor Cruz
Pete Falcone
Keith Hernandez
Don Kessinger
Bake McBride
Ken Reitz
Ted Simmons
Garry Templeton

Season standings

Record vs. opponents

Notable transactions 
 May 17, 1977: John D'Acquisto and Pat Scanlon were traded by the Cardinals to the San Diego Padres for Butch Metzger.
 June 7, 1977: Mike Jeffcoat was drafted by the St. Louis Cardinals in the 30th round of the 1977 amateur draft, but did not sign.
 June 7, 1977: Neil Fiala was drafted by the Cardinals in the 32nd round of the 1977 Major League Baseball Draft.
 June 15, 1977: Bake McBride and Steve Waterbury were traded by the Cardinals to the Philadelphia Phillies for Tom Underwood, Dane Iorg, and Rick Bosetti.
 June 15, 1977: Joel Youngblood was traded by the Cardinals to the New York Mets for Mike Phillips.
 August 20, 1977: Don Kessinger was traded by the Cardinals to the Chicago White Sox for Steve Staniland (minors).
 August 31, 1977: Clay Carroll was traded by the Cardinals to the Chicago White Sox for players to be named later. The White Sox completed the deal by sending Nyls Nyman to the Cardinals on September 2, and sending Dave Hamilton and Silvio Martínez to the Cardinals on November 28.

Roster

Player stats

Batting

Starters by position 
Note: Pos = Position; G = Games played; AB = At bats; H = Hits; Avg. = Batting average; HR = Home runs; RBI = Runs batted in

Other batters 
Note: G = Games played; AB = At bats; H = Hits; Avg. = Batting average; HR = Home runs; RBI = Runs batted in

Pitching

Starting pitchers 
Note: G = Games pitched; IP = Innings pitched; W = Wins; L = Losses; ERA = Earned run average; SO = Strikeouts

Other pitchers 
Note: G = Games pitched; IP = Innings pitched; W = Wins; L = Losses; ERA = Earned run average; SO = Strikeouts

Relief pitchers 
Note: G = Games pitched; W = Wins; L = Losses; SV = Saves; ERA = Earned run average; SO = Strikeouts

Awards and honors 
 Lou Brock, Lou Gehrig Award
 Garry Templeton, National League leader, triples (19)

Farm system 

LEAGUE CHAMPIONS: Arkansas, Gastonia

References

External links
1977 St. Louis Cardinals at Baseball Reference
1977 St. Louis Cardinals team page at www.baseball-almanac.com

St. Louis Cardinals seasons
Saint Louis Cardinals season
St Louis